Tzigane is a Canadian music television series which aired on CBC Television in 1954.

Premise
The Montreal-produced series features music and dance from central Europe. The episodes portrayed a Hungarian gypsy community on a fictitious island within the Danube river. The featured musicians were George Lapenson on violin accompanied by singers Irene Andriane and Yolande Guerard.

Scheduling
This half-hour series aired on Saturdays at 7:30 p.m. from 10 July to 25 September 1954.

References

External links
 

CBC Television original programming
1954 Canadian television series debuts
1954 Canadian television series endings
1950s Canadian music television series
Black-and-white Canadian television shows